20 is the eleventh album by Estonian rock band Terminaator, released in 2007. It is a greatest hits album. The title refers to the twentieth anniversary of the band. The mascot on the cover is drawn by Mart Himbek. The tracks include concert recordings, new versions and new songs. The album has a booklet with information about the songs and has many photos.

Track listing

Song information
CD1
Tracks 1, 4 are new versions of songs from "Minu väike paradiis".
Tracks 2, 3 are entirely new songs.
Track 5 from "Minu väike paradiis".
Tracks 6, 7 from "Singapur".
Tracks 8, 10, 11 from "Head uudised".
Track 12 from "Nagu esimene kord".
Track 13 from "Kuutõbine".
Track 14 from "Kuld".

Recorded:
1995: 5
1997: 14
1998: 6, 7
2000: 8, 10, 11
2003: 13
2005: 9
2006: 12
2007: 1-4

CD2
Tracks 1, 4, 14 from "Go Live 2005".
Tracks 2, 5, 11 from "Kuutõbine".
Track 3, 12 from "Kuld".
Track 6 from "Nagu esimene kord".
Tracks 7, 10 from the "R2 Live 2007" concert (with Kaire Vilgats and Dagmar Oja on vocals and Hele-Riin Uib on drums)
Track 8 from "Head uudised".
Track 9 is slightly renewed; from "Kuutõbine".
Track 13 from "Risk".
Track 16 from "Lõputu päev".

Recorded:
1991: 16
1997: 12, 15
2000: 8
2001: 13
2003: 2, 5, 11
2004: 9
2005: 1, 4, 14
2006: 6
2007: 7, 10

Singles
2007: Juulikuu lumi 2007
2008: Ära oota koidikuni

External links
 Delfi: Terminaator esitleb elutöö plaati About the new album and the single (in Estonian).

Terminaator albums
2007 greatest hits albums
Estonian-language compilation albums